Kwaku Agyemang Manu is the member of parliament for the constituency. He was elected on the ticket of the New Patriotic Party (NPP) won a majority of 953 votes to become the MP. He had succeeded Yaw Asiedu-Mensah who had represented the constituency in the 4th Republic parliament on the ticket of the New Patriotic Party (NPP).

Election results

See also
List of Ghana Parliament constituencies

References 

Parliamentary constituencies in the Bono Region